The 1989–90 season was the 98th season in Liverpool F.C.'s existence, and their 28th consecutive year in the top flight. This article covers the period from 1 July 1989 to 30 June 1990.

Liverpool finished the season as league champions for the 18th time, and looked on course for another double, only to be knocked off course in the final stages of the FA Cup for the third season running – this time by a dramatic 4–3 semi-final defeat against a Crystal Palace side they had beaten 9–0 in the league earlier in the season. They did finish the season nine points ahead of runners-up Aston Villa in the league, but had faced a stiff challenge from Villa for much of the season and earlier in the season from neighbouring Everton. This would be Liverpool's last title for 30 years, until the 2019-20 season.

The autumn of 1989 saw the departure of striker John Aldridge to Spain. Aldridge had lost his place in the starting line-up to a resurgent Ian Rush, who had returned to the club a year earlier after an unhappy season in Italy. Injury-plagued defender Jim Beglin was transferred to Leeds United just before the start of the season, with the defence being bolstered by the arrival of Swedish star Glenn Hysén.

Pre-season friendlies
Liverpool's entered the four-team Makita International Tournament, played at Wembley Stadium, where they lost against Arsenal in the final, having beaten Dinamo Kiev. This was followed by a tour of Scandinavia which saw wins against Malmö FF and Halmstads BK and draws with Vasalunds IF and HJK Helsinki.

Regular season

August
As FA Cup holders, Liverpool entered the Charity Shield, facing league champions Arsenal, in a rematch of the last game of the previous season when Arsenal had won the title at Anfield in dramatic circumstances. Liverpool gained some small revenge with a 1–0 win, thanks to a Peter Beardsley goal. The league campaign began with a 3–1 win over Manchester City, followed by away draws against Luton Town and Aston Villa. The month ended with a trip to Spain with a friendly against Real Madrid for the Trofeo Santiago Bernabéu. The Reds lost 2–0.

The month ended with Liverpool fifth in the table, with newly promoted Chelsea top of the league, Millwall (in only their second top flight campaign) second, local rivals Everton third and Coventry City fourth.

September
September began with a third consecutive away game, this time a 3–0 win at Derby County, followed by a 9–0 hammering of Crystal Palace at Anfield. Eight different players scored in this game, which was also notable as John Aldridge's last game for the club. Aldridge, who was leaving to join Real Sociedad, came off the bench to convert a penalty, and threw his boots and kit into the Kop at the end of the game. Aldridge had remained a first-choice player in 1988–89 after Rush's return, either playing in a three-man attack alongside Rush and Beardsley or alongside Beardsley in a two-man attack in the 14 league games that Rush was unfit for, but for 1989–90 Dalglish had decided to stick with a two-man attack of Rush and Beardsley, and Aldridge knew that leaving Anfield would be his best chance of regular first team action.

After a 0–0 home draw with Norwich City, Wigan Athletic were defeated 5–2 in the League Cup, before the first Merseyside derby of the season. Just as in the previous season's FA Cup final, and in so many derbies before, Ian Rush was the match winner, as the Reds won 3–1 at Goodison Park.

October
First up in October were Wigan in the so-called "away" leg (played at Anfield because Wigan's pitch was unplayable) of the League Cup second round. Liverpool won 3–0, with substitute Steve Staunton scoring a hat-trick to secure an 8–2 aggregate victory. Back in the league, Wimbledon were beaten 2–1 at Plough Lane before Southampton dealt the Reds a 4–1 hammering at The Dell. The misery was to continue four days later, as Arsenal ended Liverpool's League Cup campaign with a 1–0 win at Highbury. The league campaign resumed with a 1–0 win over Tottenham Hotspur, which saw Liverpool reclaim their lead of the First Division from Everton, who seemed to be re-emerging as a top club after two slightly less successful seasons under the management of Colin Harvey, since Howard Kendall's departure. Chelsea and Arsenal were still giving the two Merseyside clubs a serious run for their money, while a surprise challenge was also starting to mount from Southampton, Norwich and Aston Villa. After a generally very disappointing September, Manchester United had started to improve and were just seven points (though 10 places) behind Liverpool. The challenge from Millwall and Coventry, however, appeared to have ended as both clubs were now some way down the table.

November
November was a miserable month for Liverpool. It began with a 1–0 home defeat against Coventry City, which was compounded by a 3–2 loss at QPR. Wins at Millwall and at home to Arsenal followed, before an away game at Sheffield Wednesday. This was Liverpool's first game at Hillsborough after the tragedy of seven months earlier, and it ended in a 2–0 defeat. However, they ended the month top of the league with 27 points – bracketed together on goal difference with Arsenal, Villa and Chelsea. Southampton and Coventry were both just four points behind the leading pack, but Everton's title hopes were fading fast as they had slumped from top place to 12th within a few short weeks. Manchester United's steady improvement had continued as they had continued to narrow the gap between themselves and Liverpool – now standing at nine places but just six points.

December
December was a better month for Liverpool, who began it with an impressive 4–1 win at Manchester City (now managed by former Everton boss Howard Kendall). A 1–1 home draw with Villa followed, before a superb 5–2 win over fellow title contenders Chelsea on 16 December. A goalless draw with Manchester United came at Anfield on 23 December, with Liverpool's great rivals now enduring another run of bad form and effectively out of the title race. The next two games – against Sheffield Wednesday and Charlton Athletic – were both won, and so Liverpool ended the 1980s as First Division leaders. They had a four-point lead over their nearest rivals Aston Villa and a four-point lead over Arsenal. The challenge from the likes of Southampton, Chelsea and Norwich was becoming more distant, though a threat from North London was emerging in the shape of a Tottenham Hotspur side spearheaded by two of England's finest players – Paul Gascoigne and Gary Lineker. The challenge from Everton was now looking well and truly over, as Colin Harvey's men were now 10th in the league and 13 points adrift of Liverpool, though with a game in hand. Any hopes that Manchester United might have had of beating Liverpool to the title were now almost completely dead, as Alex Ferguson's team now stood 15th in the league and were just two points above the relegation zone.

January
A new year and a new decade began with a 2–2 draw for Liverpool at Nottingham Forest on New Year's Day. Then came an FA Cup third round clash with Swansea City at Vetch Field. The Swans were now in the Third Division and the run for their money that they had given Liverpool eight years earlier was now very much a distant memory, but the Swans gave Liverpool a scare by holding them to a goalless draw. However, Liverpool blew Swansea to pieces in the replay at Anfield three days later by winning 8–0. Their FA Cup action (a fourth round clash with Norwich ending in a 3–1 replay win at Anfield after a goalless draw in the first game at Carrow Road) meant that there would be just two more league games that month – the first a 2–2 home draw with Luton, the second a 2–0 win over Crystal Palace at Selhurst Park. However, Liverpool remained top of the league – level on points with Aston Villa with Arsenal as the only other serious contenders, though Nottingham Forest had now climbed into fourth place and were starting to raise a few eyebrows among observers in the title race.

February
Liverpool remained on course for a unique second double as they beat Southampton 3–0 in the fifth round at Anfield on 17 February. Bad weather meant that there were just two league games for Liverpool that month, the first a 2–1 Merseyside derby win over Everton at Anfield, the second a goalless draw at Norwich.

March
Liverpool moved closer to a second double on 14 March when they beat QPR 1–0 in the quarter-final replay at Anfield, three days after drawing the first match 2–2 at Loftus Road. In the league, they defeated Millwall, Manchester United and Southampton but lost to Tottenham Hotspur. They were still top of the league, on goal difference ahead of Aston Villa and with a game in hand. Arsenal were now the only other team looking like a serious threat to the Reds, and, although Everton's recent revival had seen them climb to fifth place, it was now almost certainly too late for them to pip Liverpool to the league title.

22 March saw the arrival at Anfield of 26-year-old Israeli striker Ronny Rosenthal on loan from Belgian club Standard Liège.

April
April was a very mixed month for Liverpool. They finally clinched the league title on 28 April with two games to spare, thanks to a 2–1 home win over QPR, but 8 April saw their "double double" hopes ended in dramatic fashion for the third season running, this time in the shape of an FA Cup semi-final defeat to Crystal Palace (the team they had beaten 9–0 in the league seven months earlier) where the South Londoners had beaten them 4–3 in extra time to book a Wembley date with Manchester United in the final. Liverpool had now been champions of England on no fewer than 18 occasions – more than any other side at the time.

May
The Reds proved themselves as worthy champions by winning both of their final two games: a slender 1–0 home win over Derby followed by a 6–1 hammering of Coventry at Highfield Road on the final day of the season.

Ronny Rosenthal's loan deal became permanent at the end of the season when Liverpool paid Standard Liège £1 million for his services, which had already seen him net seven goals in just eight league games – including a hat-trick in the 4–0 away win over relegation-bound Charlton.

Squad

Goalkeepers

   Bruce Grobbelaar
   Mike Hooper

Defenders

   Gary Ablett
  David Burrows
   Gary Gillespie
   Alan Hansen
   Glenn Hysén
   Steve Nicol
   Steve Staunton
   Nick Tanner
   Barry Venison
   Alex Watson

Midfielders

   John Barnes
   Ray Houghton
   Steve McMahon
   Jim Magilton
   Mike Marsh
   Jan Mølby
   Nigel Spackman
   Ronnie Whelan

Attackers

   John Aldridge
   Peter Beardsley
   Ronny Rosenthal
   Ian Rush
   Kenny Dalglish

Transfers

In

Out

Loaned In

League table

Matches

Pre-Season Friendlies

FA Charity Shield

First Division

FA Cup

League Cup

Notes

References
 
 

1989–90
1990
Liverpool F.C.